Baliqiao Station is a station on the  of the Beijing Subway.

Station layout 
The station has an underground island platform.

Exits 
The station has 6 exits, lettered A1, A2, B1, B2, B3, and B4. Exits A1 and A2 are accessible.

External links

Beijing Subway stations in Chaoyang District
Railway stations in China opened in 2003